Fornes may refer to the following:

Places

Norway
Fornes, Nordland, a village in Åndøy municipality, Nordland county
Fornes, Trøndelag, a village in Stjørdal municipality, Trøndelag county
Fornes, Skånland, a village in Skånland municipality, Troms county
Fornes, Troms, a village in Ibestad municipality, Troms county

Spain
Fornes, Granada, a village and municipality in Granada province

Other
Fornes (surname)
Fornes dialects, dialects that are spoken in two villages in Italy
, a Norwegian Government ship in service from 1946 to 1948
Fornes' colilargo, a South American rodent also known as Oligoryzomys fornesi